Lorraine Bracco (born October 2, 1954) is an American actress. Known for her distinct husky voice and Brooklyn accent, she has been nominated for an Academy Award, four Emmy Awards, four Golden Globe Awards, and three Screen Actors Guild Awards.

Born in New York City, Bracco began her career modeling in France and began appearing in Italian-language films in the 1980s, including Lina Wertmüller's Camorra (1986), which featured Bracco's then-partner Harvey Keitel. Bracco's English-language debut came in The Pick-Up Artist (1987), which was followed by roles in Someone to Watch Over Me (1987), Sing (1989), and The Dream Team (1989). Her breakthrough role was that of Karen Hill, wife of mob associate Henry Hill, in Martin Scorsese's Goodfellas (1990), for which she was nominated for the Academy Award for Best Supporting Actress and the Golden Globe Award for Best Supporting Actress – Motion Picture.

On television, she is best known for portraying Jennifer Melfi, the psychiatrist of Tony Soprano, in the HBO series The Sopranos (1999–2007). She was nominated for the Primetime Emmy Award for Outstanding Lead Actress in a Drama Series and the Golden Globe Award for Best Actress – Television Series Drama for her performance across the show's first three seasons. Beginning with the fourth season her role began to decline slightly, though by the end of the series, at the 59th Primetime Emmy Awards, she was nominated for the Primetime Emmy Award for Outstanding Supporting Actress in a Drama Series.

Early life

Bracco was born on October 2, 1954, in the Bay Ridge neighborhood of the Brooklyn borough of New York City, New York. She is the daughter of Eileen (née Molyneux) and Salvatore S. Bracco Sr. She has a sister, actress Elizabeth Bracco, and a brother, Salvatore Jr. Her father was of Italian descent, while her mother was born in England, and had some French ancestry. Her parents met during World War II, marrying in Andover in 1946; Eileen came with Salvatore to the United States as a war bride. Bracco grew up in Hicksville, New York, on Long Island, from fourth grade, and graduated from Hicksville High School in 1972.

Career
Bracco moved to France in 1974, where she became a fashion model for Jean-Paul Gaultier. She lived there for about a decade.

While still modeling, Bracco was approached by Marc Camoletti, who offered her a major role in the film adaptation of one of his plays, Duos sur canapé (1979). Bracco did not imagine that she could be an actress, and initially refused. She eventually made the film, but found the experience "boring" and her performance "terrible." Nevertheless, she played supporting roles in two other French films "for the money."

After one of her friends suggested that she might enjoy acting if she took some training, she took seminars with John Strasberg. Although she loved the lessons, she was still unsure of her talents.

During the 1980s, she worked as a disc jockey for Radio Luxembourg. She also appeared as Paul Guilfoyle's hostage in the first season of the series Crime Story, in the episode "Hide and Go Thief". Her sister Elizabeth played a coffee shop waitress in the series pilot.

Eventually, Italian director and novelist Lina Wertmüller gave Bracco a small part in the film Camorra. "She dressed me up like an Italian woman of no means. A street woman clad in disheveled clothes, hair unkempt and all that, and threw me on the set. She was so creative. I mean, Lina accentuated my eyes with dark make-up, the way Sophia Loren used to appear in those epic roles in the '60s. And talk about talent. She's so bright and perceptive. I mean, she's just fantastic. And yes, I learned a lot from her. She's a master of her profession, and I've been blessed not only with her, but also with so many masters," recounted Bracco to Daniel Simone during a 2007 interview. The experience inspired Bracco to pursue acting.

Her other films include Someone to Watch Over Me, Switch, Riding in Cars with Boys, The Basketball Diaries, Medicine Man, Radio Flyer, and Hackers.

Bracco received her big career break when she was offered the role of mobster wife Karen Hill in Goodfellas, which earned her an Academy Award nomination for Best Supporting Actress and a Golden Globe nomination for Best Supporting Actress – Motion Picture. She won the Los Angeles Film Critics Association Award for Best Supporting Actress and the Chicago Film Critics Association Award for Best Supporting Actress.

During the audition process for The Sopranos, David Chase wanted Bracco to audition for the lead female role of Carmela Soprano. However, Bracco had read the script and was drawn to the part of psychiatrist Jennifer Melfi as she wanted to try something different and felt that the part of the highly educated Dr. Melfi would be more of a challenge for her.  Bracco felt so strongly about her ability and desire to play the part that she arranged a meeting with Chase and talked him into letting her have a chance as Melfi. It netted her three consecutive nominations for Outstanding Lead Actress in a Drama Series at the Emmy Awards in 1999, 2000, and 2001, and at the Golden Globe awards for Best TV Actress in a Drama in 2000, 2001, and 2002. She lost out at the Emmys in 1999 and 2001, and at the Golden Globes in 2000 to her co-star Edie Falco. She was nominated again at the 2007 Emmy Awards for Outstanding Supporting Actress in a Drama Series, and thus was pitted against her The Sopranos co-star Aida Turturro for the award.

Bracco is the owner of Bracco Wines, in association with Straight-Up Brands LLC. Her line of wines was featured on the Season 1 finale of Bravo's show Top Chef in 2006. She appeared as a guest judge for the show's two-episode finale and as a special judge on Top Chef: All Stars, in the episode titled "An Offer They Can't Refuse", which featured Italian cuisine. Bracco also appeared on a season 6 episode of Throwdown! with Bobby Flay, as a guest judge for the ravioli throwdown.

From 2010 to 2016, Bracco co-starred on the TNT crime drama Rizzoli & Isles as Angela Rizzoli, mother of one of the titular characters Jane Rizzoli, portrayed by Angie Harmon. She appeared in all 105 episodes of the series over its seven season run. 

Beginning in 2016, Bracco had a recurring role as Toni on the Showtime comedy series Dice. In 2017-2018, she had a five-episode recurring role as Mayor Margaret Dutton in the CBS police drama series Blue Bloods.

In 2020, Bracco starred in the HGTV documentary television series My Big Italian Adventure. It chronicled her  renovation of a 200-year-old house she purchased for €1 at Via Guglielmo Marconi and was shot in Sambuca di Sicilia.

In 2022, Bracco worked in the Robert Zemeckis remake of Pinocchio where she voiced Sofia the Seagull.

Personal life
Bracco has been married and divorced twice.

She married Frenchman Daniel Guerard in 1979; they divorced in 1982. They have one daughter, actress Margaux Guerard.

She was in a 12-year relationship with actor Harvey Keitel, whom she met while living in Paris. They have one daughter, Stella Keitel (born 1985). Bracco and Keitel fought a lengthy custody battle over Stella, resulting in Bracco's depression and $2 million in legal fees.

Bracco's second marriage was to actor Edward James Olmos in 1994; they divorced in 2002.

Bracco is a practitioner of Shotokan Karate. In 2015, she wrote a self-help book, To the Fullest: The Clean Up Your Act Plan to Lose Weight, Rejuvenate, and Be the Best You Can Be.

Filmography

Film

Television

Awards and nominations

See also
List of celebrities who own wineries and vineyards

References

Bibliography

External links

Lorraine Bracco at the archive.org copy of the-sopranos.com
New York Times interview

1954 births
Living people
Actresses from New York (state)
American expatriates in France
New York (state) Democrats
Female models from New York (state)
American film actresses
American people of English descent
American people of French descent
American people of Italian descent
American television actresses
American voice actresses
Shotokan practitioners
American female karateka
20th-century American actresses
21st-century American actresses
People from Westbury, New York
People from Bay Ridge, Brooklyn